Ivan Teterin (born December 2, 1995) is a Russian professional ice hockey defenceman. He is currently playing with Avtomobilist Yekaterinburg of the Kontinental Hockey League (KHL).

Teterin made his Kontinental Hockey League debut playing with Avtomobilist Yekaterinburg during the 2013–14 KHL season.

References

External links

1995 births
Living people
Avtomobilist Yekaterinburg players
Russian ice hockey defencemen
People from Tyumen
Sportspeople from Tyumen Oblast